R331 road may refer to:
 R331 road (Ireland)
 R331 road (South Africa)